Tauzia station is located on line  of the tramway de Bordeaux.

Location
The station is located on Tauzia road in Bordeaux.

Junctions
There are no junctions with other lines or buses at this station.

Close by
 INSEE

See also
 TBC
 Tramway de Bordeaux

Bordeaux tramway stops
Tram stops in Bordeaux
Railway stations in France opened in 2004